Day of the Animals (re-released as Something Is Out There) is a 1977 American natural horror film directed by William Girdler, based on a story by producer Edward L. Montoro. The film reunited Girdler and Montoro with stars Christopher George and Richard Jaeckel from the previous year's Grizzly. It co-stars Lynda Day George and Leslie Nielsen.

Day of the Animals  tells the story of a psychosis brought on by depletion of the Earth's ozone layer, affecting all animals at high altitudes. A group of hapless hikers must survive the animal onslaught and make their way to safety, even as the psychosis turns them against each other.

Plot
The depletion of the Earth's ozone layer by CFC aerosols has been causing increased exposure to UV radiation at high altitudes. Scientists observe that animals over 5,000 feet in altitude have become highly aggressive toward humans.

At Murphy's Hotel in an alpine village somewhere in Northern California, Steve Buckner (Christopher George) prepares to board a dozen hikers into two helicopters to fly up the mountain to Sugar Meadow, where they will begin a days-long nature hike. Local ranger Chico Tucker (Walter Barnes) privately tells Steve that there have been all kinds of accidents lately and maybe this hike is not a good idea, but Steve refuses to call it off.

Steve and his group then set off and, after a short rest, the group is introduced: Professor MacGregor (Richard Jaeckel), an anthropologist; Frank and Mandy Young (Jon Cedar and Susan Backlinie), a bickering married couple; a wealthy older woman, Shirley Goodwyn (Ruth Roman) and her son, Johnny (Bobby Porter); Paul Jenson (Leslie Nielsen), an advertising executive and psychopath with an angry, derisive sense of humor; Bob Denning (Andrew Stevens) and Beth Hughes (Kathleen Bracken), a teenage couple; Roy Moore (Paul Mantee), a former professional football player sidelined by cancer; Terry Marsh (Lynda Day George), a television reporter; and Daniel Santee (Michael Ansara), a Native American guide and the steadiest person among them.

Meanwhile, in the restaurant of Murphy's Hotel, Tucker sits down with Burt, the local sheriff, and tells him that there has been a spate of rattlesnake bites. At that moment, a reporter on the bar's television set says a White House bulletin is claiming that chemical waste released into the atmosphere has dangerously depleted the ozone layer, which protects all life on Earth from the sun's radiation.

On the mountain, the hikers stumble upon a camp where a fire is burning and coffee cups are ready to be filled, but no one is around. Steve says that the campers will soon be back and leads the hikers to a nearby spot to bed down for the night. They build a fire, and while Daniel pulls Steve aside to tell him that something strange is going on in the woods, Steve asks him not to say anything so as not to panic the others. The two decide to take turns standing guard. That night, as Terry wonders why the other campers have not returned, several wolves attack Mandy in her sleeping bag. The campers chase them off, but Mandy's hand has been badly bitten and she needs medical attention.

At daybreak, Mandy and Frank leave the others and hike to a nearby ranger tower to call for a helicopter, but various species of birds gather in the trees and circle overhead. Suddenly, hawks swoop down and attack her and, before Frank can chase them off, Mandy falls over a cliff to her death.

Meanwhile, as the rest of the hikers continue down the mountain, Johnny picks up snatches of radio reports about an ozone emergency, resulting in a chemical imbalance in the forest. When Johnny alarms the other hikers, Shirley shouts at him and accidentally knocks his radio into a creek. When the hikers reach a spot where food has been left for them, they find that the boxes have been ripped apart by raiding animals and nothing is left. Jenson, challenging Steve's competence, says the group should stay there and wait for a helicopter to return, but Steve insists on pushing on down the mountain.

Frank is wading through a creek when he finds a little girl standing on the bank. Frank asks the girl where her parents are, but she is in shock and does not react to him until a hawk swoops down and makes her scream. Frank picks her up and carries her away.

At the camp, after mountain lions attack the hikers again and injure Daniel, Jenson (who is clearly growing more deranged due to the solar radiation now affecting his mind) says he is going to walk back up the mountain to the ranger tower, which is closer than the village. He convinces Shirley, Johnny, Bob and Beth to go with him, as the others continue down the mountain. That night, as lightning flashes and rain pours, Jenson, now completely insane, abuses Shirley and threatens to kill Johnny. Bob and Beth realize that they have made a mistake by coming with Jenson, as he is the only human now affected by the sun's radiation, Jenson kills Bob by impaling him with his walking stick. As he drags Beth away to rape her, a large grizzly bear appears. Jenson wrestles the bear, but he is quickly outmatched as it overpowers and kills him by biting a chunk of his neck out and then devouring him. Shirley and Johnny grab Beth and run away.

That night in town, Ranger Tucker is awakened by the telephone. Burt tells him the National Guard is in town to evacuate everybody above 5,000 feet, where the radiation is the strongest, making all animals aggressive and attacking people. As Tucker hangs up, he hears something rattling and gnawing. He turns on the kitchen light, finds the room empty, and gets a plate of ham out of the refrigerator. But as Tucker goes into a drawer for a knife, some rats jump onto the table. Tucker tries to stab them, but a couple of rats leap on him. Tucker runs upstairs to wake his wife, Rita. They hurry outside and get into their car and escape before several dogs can kill them.

In the morning, after a night of walking, Frank and the little girl arrive in the deserted village. Outside Murphy's Hotel, a dog attacks them. Frank puts the girl inside a vehicle, grabs a hammer from a toolbox and makes a run for his car nearby. As soon as Frank reaches his car and opens the passenger door, several rattlesnakes inside bite him. This results in the dog attacking Frank and killing him.

Meanwhile, Shirley, Johnny and Beth take sanctuary in a grounded Park Ranger helicopter whose pilot has been killed by a pack of dogs.

Steve's group is attacked by another pack of dogs at a camp of dilapidated cabins. Professor MacGregor and Roy are both killed by the dogs, as Steve, Terry and Daniel run off. The three hurry down to the nearby creek and push a raft into the water, but as they push off, the dogs leap onto the raft, forcing them overboard. The three hang onto the raft as a current catches it and pulls it downstream through the rapids, while the dogs on the raft eventually drown.

Some time later, Shirley, Johnny and Beth are still in the grounded helicopter. Everything is quiet and the dogs are all dead. As Johnny and Shirley step out of the chopper, they hear another helicopter coming and shout and wave their hands as it approaches.

In town, U.S. Army soldiers in hazardous-material suits approach Murphy's Hotel. Dead animals lay everywhere, killed by the very same solar radiation that made them hostile in the first place. Four of the soldiers see the little girl hiding inside the car where Frank left her and rescue her.

Not far away, Steve, Terry and Daniel are sleeping on the drifting raft when they hear voices and a distant siren. Looking up, they see a dozen people standing on a bridge, welcoming them back to the normal world.

In the final shot, a surviving golden eagle flies at the camera, which pauses the shot. Right after the pause, the credits roll.

Cast
Christopher George as Steve Buckner
Leslie Nielsen as Paul Jenson
Lynda Day George as Terry Marsh
Richard Jaeckel as Prof. Taylor MacGregor
Michael Ansara as Daniel Santee
Ruth Roman as Mrs. Shirley Goodwyn
Jon Cedar as Frank Young
Paul Mantee as Roy Moore
Walter Barnes as Ranger Tucker
Andrew Stevens as Bob Denning
Susan Backlinie as Mandy Young

Production
The budget of the production was $1.2 million and shooting took place at Long Barn, California, on Todd-AO 35 film, with the cast recalling that they had a good time.

The animals for the film were trained by Monty Cox, veteran of such productions as Apocalypse Now and The Incredible Hulk, who partnered with cast member Susan Backlinie, who also doubled for Lynda Day George in some scenes. Leslie Nielsen later recalled being very impressed by the grizzly bear.

Release
Day of the Animals was released in U.S. theaters on May 13, 1977 and a movie tie-in novelization, written by Donald Porter, accompanied its release.

Reception
Day of the Animals was mostly panned by critics for its poor special effects, goofy premise, banal execution (derivative of The Birds) and on-the-nose environmental themes.<ref></ref>

Some critics have recommended the film to fans of natural horror and disaster films of the 1970s, with AllMovie comparing it to Kingdom of the Spiders and Frogs. Additionally, the film has a cult following among many who saw it at a young age.

Home video
The film was first released on VHS in pan-and-scan format. Media Blasters released the film on DVD on April 25, 2006, under its "Shriek Show" imprint, featuring interviews with actors Jon Cedar and Paul Mantee integrated into a featurette.

Scorpion Releasing released a Blu-ray and a second DVD in November 2013, featuring extended versions of the Media Blasters interviews, a soundtrack isolating Schifrin's score and the original TV spot. Katarina Waters hosted an introductory "Katarina's Nightmare Theater" segment.

On March 24, 2017, Rifftrax released a VOD of the film with comedic commentary by Michael J. Nelson, Kevin Murphy and Bill Corbett.

In 2021, it was re-released Region Free on DVD and Blu-ray by Severin Films.

See also
 Dark Night of the Scarecrow, a 1981 TV horror film
 Grizzly List of natural horror films
 :it:Wild Beasts - Belve feroci
 Zoombies''

References

External links
 
 
 
 The Hollywood films of William Girdler at williamgirdler.com

1977 films
Films directed by William Girdler
1977 horror films
American natural horror films
Environmental films
American disaster films
American independent films
Films scored by Lalo Schifrin
Films set in California
Films shot in California
1970s American films